Merriam can refer to:

People
 Alan P. Merriam (1923–1980), American ethnomusicologist
 Charles Edward Merriam (1874–1953), American political scientist
Charles W. Merriam (1877–1961), American insurance businessman and politician
 Clinton Hart Merriam (1855–1942), American zoologist and anthropologist
 Clinton Levi Merriam (1824–1900), United States Representative from New York
 Eve Merriam (1916–1992), American poet
 Frank Merriam (1865–1955), American politician and 28th governor of California
Gordon Phelps Merriam (1899–1999), American soldier and diplomat
 Henry Clay Merriam, American general
 John Campbell Merriam (1869–1945), American paleontologist
 William Rush Merriam (1849–1934), American politician and 11th governor of Minnesota
 George Merriam (1803–1880) and his brother Charles, founders of G. and C. Merriam, later Merriam-Webster
 Sarah A. L. Merriam (1971–), American lawyer and judge on the U.S. Court of Appeals for the Second Circuit

Places in the United States
 Merriam, Indiana
 Merriam, Kansas
 Merriam, Minnesota
 Merriam Woods, Missouri

Other uses
 Merriam-Webster, a publishing company specializing in reference books
 Merriam's pocket mouse (Perognathus merriami)
 Merriam's wild turkey (Meleagris gallopavo merriami)

See also